

Simone Weimans (born 23 November 1971) is a Dutch presenter. Since 2011 she is a news presenter of the Dutch public news broadcaster NOS Journaal.

See also
 List of news presenters

References

External links
 
 

1971 births
Living people
People from Rotterdam
Dutch television presenters
Dutch television news presenters
Dutch radio presenters
Dutch women radio presenters
Dutch women television presenters
University of Amsterdam alumni